Maurice "Jake" Day (July 2, 1892 – May 17, 1983) was an American artist, sculptor, photographer, naturalist and illustrator. He is best known for creating the fawn-like character of Bambi for the 1942 animated Walt Disney feature film Bambi.

Early life
Maurice Ellicott Day was born in Damariscotta, Maine in the Day family homestead that his great-grandfather built in 1892. His ancestors were shipbuilders from the 1600s. He attended school at Lincoln Academy in Newcastle, Maine, studied art and painting at the Massachusetts College of Art and graduated from the Museum of Fine Arts in Boston in 1915. He was known to his family and friends as "Jake"; but no one knows how or when he received the nickname.

After serving in World War I, Day returned to his hometown; continuing to work as an artist. An avid outdoors man, he hiked the Katahdin region of Northern Maine long before it had trails. His adventures were featured in many outdoor sporting stories by Edmund Ware Smith; which Day also illustrated. In addition, Day illustrated works for other authors such as naturalist Henry Beston and Elizabeth Coatsworth; and for publications such as the Vanity Fair, Life, Atlantic Monthly, House Beautiful, and Outdoor Life. Known for his humor, Day created witty editorial cartoons for the Portland Press Herald, Lewiston Sun Journal, and Waterville Sentinel.

Bambi
Day's artistic talents acquired him positions at various animation studios including MGM, Harman and Ising, and Hanna Barbera.
In 1936, he joined the Walt Disney Studios in California; working as illustrator and layout artist for films such as Merbabies. But it wasn't until Disney obtained the rights to the 1923 book Bambi, a Life in the Woods by Felix Salten that Day established his name with the studio; becoming known as "one of the first and best-known animators at Disney Studios."

Bambi, the main character of the book, was a roe deer, a species native to Europe; but, Disney decided to base the character on a mule deer from Arrowhead, California. Day argued the point that mule deer had large "mule-like" ears and were more indigenous to western North America; while the white-tail deer was more commonly recognized throughout America. Although Day was considered Disney's best animator at the time, one whom he trusted faithfully, Disney said: "Prove it."

Disney sent Day to Maine with a list of scenic images specific to the landscape to photograph: hazel nuts, marsh grass, oak leaves, pine cones, birch bark, low-bush and high-bush blueberries, red maple and speckled alder trees. Day did more than that; he took photos of "trees glittering with ice, snowy beaver dams and trees charred by fire. He photographed not only details of the forest floor: the lichen, leaves, ferns, pools, rotting logs, pitcher plants, autumn leaves; but even a bear cub’s footprints in the mud" and fire burnt trees. At night, Day and his traveling companion Lester Hall would study the shooting script to see where they should venture the next day to capture just the right image to accompany such scenes as: Bambi's first walk, mouse encounters, and Thumper's environment. Days campaign prevailed, and Disney gave the green light for Bambi to be a white-tail deer.

"We had to remember," Day said, "that Disney has a ruthless fidelity to the physical scene, to the truth of nature, even when he may seem to the distorting nature. When corn gets into a picture, then make no mistake about it, corn must be an actor. And so up there in the Katahdin wild, when I took a shot – well, if it was only a short of a burnt tree, or some great webby root grasping at rockly soil, or a lichen like a colored shell wedged into a rough bark – I had to consider that Disney might say to me, 'What does that say to you? What do you feel? What does it do to you? Put it down on paper!'" In the end, Day took over a thousand photographs.

Since Disney animators had never seen a live white-tail deer, Day arranged with the Maine Department of Economic Development to have two four-month old orphaned fawns brought from Maine to be sketched by the studio artists. When the two fawns were delivered to the area Railway Express office, the sign on the truck read: "Walt Disney's new 'Find From Maine', Bambi, enroute (sic) to Hollywood to act as model for the 'hero' in Disney's next full length picture, "Bambi'. He is travelling (sic) with his girl friend, Faline – from Maine to California by Railway express." For a period of nine months, animators drew the fawns as they aged into young adulthood; losing their spots in the process. Upon arrival, the fawns were fed milk formula, lime juice and Maine spring water.

Over all, the film took 5 years to complete; during which time the two deer lived at the Disney studios. Shortly after, the model for Bambi died; but Faline was transported to Griffith Park Zoo in Los Angeles, California where she became a mother. Upon release of the film, Disney wished to premiere the film in Augusta, Maine to recognize Day's considerable contributions to the film. However, due to possible protests from the strong hunting community within the state, officials voted against premiering the film in Maine. Instead, Bambi premiered in London on August 8, 1942, then at Radio City Music Hall in New York City; before having its first "public showing" in Portland, Maine.

Later life
While working on the film Bambi, Day grew homesick for his native state of Maine. He moved back home with his family in 1940. Always connected with the outdoors, Day traveled extensively throughout the state of Maine. Hiking and exploring various parks along with his band of fellow sportsmen called "Jake's Rangers", Day was affectionately called "Colonel Jake".

In the mid-1940s, Day began to experiment in creating dioramas; entering a local holiday decoration competition. With his first entry, an Eskimo village, a Day household Christmas tradition began that spanned 70 years. Displayed in the front window of the Day home on Bristol road in Damariscotta, some measuring six feet in length, both adults and children throughout the town gathered annually to view the dioramas.  Following his death in 1983, the collection of dioramas were given to the Farnsworth Art Museum in Rockland, Maine. Over the years, several units suffered damage due to being exposed to the elements; but relatives restored many of them to their original state.

At age 78, Day climbed Mount Katahdin with then governor Ken Curtis. He planned to climb again on his 80th birthday in 1973, except there were "too many black flies." Maurice "Jake" Day died at the age of 90 on May 17, 1983. He was survived by his second wife, Martha Beane Larson Day and three children.

Legacy
In 1967, Governor Percival P. Baxter appointed him "artist in residence" of Baxter State Park; for which Day designed the park's seal and illustrated the park's map. The University of Maine and Unity College awarded Day honorary degrees; and three Maine Governors selected him for membership with the Maine Arts Commission.

Maurice Day married Beatrice Darling Day, his first wife, and had two sons: Richard Beston Day and Dr. McClure "Mac" Day. Day's son "Mac" continued his father's legacy by spending time with outdoor sporting friends known as "Jake's Rangers"; a group originally made famous in articles by Edmond Ware Smith in the magazine Field and Stream.

Filmography

Bibliography

References

External links 

 

1892 births
1983 deaths
People from Damariscotta, Maine
American magazine illustrators
American artists
Walt Disney Animation Studios people
Disney imagineers